The 1969 Wisconsin Badgers football team represented the University of Wisconsin in the 1969 Big Ten Conference football season.

Schedule

Roster

1970 NFL Draft

References

Wisconsin
Wisconsin Badgers football seasons
Wisconsin Badgers football